One Minute to Zero is a 1952 American romantic war film starring Robert Mitchum and Ann Blyth, set during the opening phases of the Korean War, and produced by Howard Hughes as his last film as producer. Victor Young's score for the film includes the first appearance of "When I Fall in Love", as the instrumental titled "Theme from One Minute to Zero". The film showcases the contributions of the U.S. Army and U.S. Air Force, the South Korean Army, the United Nations, the British Army and the Royal Australian Air Force during the early days of the Korean War. The effects of air power in the Korean War were also vividly depicted through the use of combat footage.

Plot
Just prior to the North Korean invasion of South Korea, World War II U.S. Army veterans Colonel Steve Janowski (Robert Mitchum) and Sergeant Baker (Charles McGraw) are teaching South Korean soldiers how to use a bazooka to stop an enemy tank. Linda Day (Ann Blyth) is a United Nations worker assisting refugees. Janowski warns Day and her colleagues to leave the area because hostilities are imminent. Day, however, insists that the North Koreans would not risk the wrath of world opinion. In response, Janowski asks her if world opinion stopped Hitler.

Soon after, Janowski and U.S. Air Force Colonel Joe Parker (William Talman) wake up and find themselves under attack. They compare the attack to Pearl Harbor ("Isn't this where we came in?" "It's even Sunday morning!"). Janowski takes command of a U.S. Army unit which is helping to evacuate Americans and refugees. While doing his job, he keeps crossing paths, and falling in love, with Day. It turns out that she is reluctant to get involved with a soldier because she is the widow of a Medal of Honor recipient.

As part of a desperate situation, Janowski is confronted by a column of refugees which has been infiltrated by armed North Korean guerrillas. He has no choice but to call in an artillery strike. Even though Janowski is remorseful for the civilian casualties, Day initially condemns him for killing innocent people. After she finds out the reason for Janowski's action (and that he was right), she apologizes.

Janowski leads a successful American counter offensive against the enemy.  The contributions of the British Army and the Royal Australian Air Force are both featured in the film, and are both explicitly mentioned as evidence that "the whole world" is "in this together".

Cast

As appearing in One Minute to Zero (main roles and screen credits identified):

 Robert Mitchum as Col. Steve Janowski
 Ann Blyth as  Linda Day
 William Talman as  Col. John Parker
 Charles McGraw as Sgt. Baker
 Margaret Sheridan  as  Mary Parker
 Richard Egan as Capt. Ralston
 Eduard Franz as  Gustav Engstrand
 Robert Osterloh as Major Davis
 Robert Gist as Major Carter
 Stuart Whitman as Officer (uncredited)
 Kathleen O'Malley as Mrs. Norton 
 Wallace Russell as Pilot Norton
 Lalo Ríos as Pvt. Chico Mendoza (uncredited)

Production
The film's working title was The Korean Story. Ted Tetzlaff was the first director assigned by RKO. He was replaced, however, by Tay Garnett because producer Edmund Grainger (famed for Sands of Iwo Jima and Flying Leathernecks) wanted a "bigger" name as director.

The original actress chosen as leading lady was Claudette Colbert. She became ill with pneumonia, however, and although Grainger wanted Joan Crawford, the role had been rewritten for a younger person. Eventually, Ann Blyth became the replacement.

Although RKO attempted to shoot second unit footage in South Korea, One Minute to Zero was filmed at Fort Carson, Colorado, using troops of the 148th Field Artillery. During a break, Mitchum, Egan, McGraw and other cast members showed up at a local hotel bar frequented by the soldiers in the nearby base. McGraw got into an argument with an army private escalating from a shoving match to a fistfight when Mitchum tried to break it up. The soldier ended up being stretchered out but news of the altercation resulted in Hughes having to intervene when U.S. Army officials threatened to pull their support for the film.

Howard Hughes, the owner of RKO, had received massive U.S. military cooperation in the making this film.  Nonetheless, he refused to delete the refugee massacre scene when requested to do so by the U.S. Army.

Victor Young's score for the film includes the first appearance of "When I Fall In Love." It is performed as an instrumental piece by its lyricist, Edward Heyman. The song, performed here by Doris Day, went on to become a popular hit song recorded by a variety of artists.

Reception
Although considered standard fare for war films, even tinged with propaganda, One Minute to Zero received notice because of one controversial scene showing the U.S. shelling refugees being forced through U.N. lines by North Korean infiltrators. Bosley Crowther of The New York Times dismissed most of the action-based story in a review that noted, "Like a great many war pictures, this one is partly contrived with elements not only of romance but also of melodrama, comedy, and tears. There is the usual amount of jaw-jutting by angry and earnest G. I.'s who find themselves caught in situations from which salvation seems beyond hope. ... Plainly, "One Minute to Zero" is a ripely synthetic affair, arranged to arouse emotions with the easiest and obvious clichés. And, although some of the battle talk sounds faithful and the inter-cut news shots are sincere, neither the story nor the performances of the actors, including Miss Blyth and Mr. Mitchum, rings true. Here is another war picture that smells of greasepaint and studios."

Along with Retreat, Hell! which premiered earlier in the same year, One Minute To Zero was heavily promoted in some locales where a number of drive-in theaters showed it as their only option for several consecutive months.  This was the case at a series of locally owned drive-in theaters in Indiana, Illinois, Michigan, Ohio, and Wisconsin.  As a result of this in the Wisconsin counties of Polk County, Barron County, Price County, Clark County, Marinette County, Oconto County, Shawano County, Waupaca County, Dodge County and Taylor County it was the only movie one could see in a drive-in for multiple consecutive months.  This was also the case in the Indiana counties of Kosciusko County, Whitley County, Huntington County, Adams County, Morgan County, Jackson County and Greene County as well as in Ogle County, Illinois and Bureau County, Illinois.  These same theaters had shown Retreat Hell! as their only feature for several months earlier in the same year until they switched over to showing One Minute to Zero as their only option for the following several months that July.  These same drive-in theaters would only do this again on one more occasion, which would be for the movie Tarzan and the Lost Safari which was released in 1957

The intercutting of stock footage of USAF Lockheed F-80 Shooting Star and Royal Australian Air Force North American P-51 Mustang fighter-bombers, along with other aerial sequences has made One Minute to Zero an aviation film buff's favorite.

Notes

References

Bibliography

 Eells, George. Robert Mitchum: A Biography. New York: Franklin Watts, 1984. .
 Evans, Alun. Brassey's Guide to War Films. Dulles, Virginia: Potomac Books, 2000. .
 Hanley, Charles J., Sang-Hun Choe and Martha Mendoza. The Bridge at No Gun Ri. New York: Henry Holt and Company, 2001. .
 Jewell, Richard and Vernon Harbin. The RKO Story. New Rochelle, New York: Arlington House, 1982. .
 Rode, Alan K. Charles McGraw: Biography of a Film Noir Tough Guy. Jefferson, North Carolina: McFarland, 2007. .
 Suid, Lawrence. Guts and Glory: The Making of the American Military Image. Lexington, Kentucky: University of Kentucky Press, 2002. .

External links

 
 
 
 
 

1952 films
1950s war drama films
American aviation films
American black-and-white films
American war drama films
1950s English-language films
Films directed by Tay Garnett
Films scored by Victor Young
Films shot in Colorado
Korean War films
RKO Pictures films
United States in the Korean War
War romance films
1952 drama films
1950s American films